Sir Kazuo Ishiguro  (born 8 November 1954) is a Japanese-British novelist, screenwriter, musician, and short-story writer. Ishiguro was born in Nagasaki, Japan, and moved to Britain in 1960 with his parents when he was five.

He is one of the most critically-acclaimed and praised contemporary fiction authors writing in English, having been awarded the 2017 Nobel Prize in Literature. In its citation, the Swedish Academy described Ishiguro as a writer "who, in novels of great emotional force, has uncovered the abyss beneath our illusory sense of connection with the world".

His first two novels, A Pale View of Hills and An Artist of the Floating World, were noted for their explorations of Japanese identity and their mournful tone. He thereafter explored other genres, including science fiction and historical fiction. He has been nominated for the Booker Prize four times, winning the prize in 1989 for his novel The Remains of the Day, which was adapted into a film of the same name in 1993. Salman Rushdie praised the novel as Ishiguro's masterpiece, in which he "turned away from the Japanese settings of his first two novels and revealed that his sensibility was not rooted in any one place, but capable of travel and metamorphosis". Time named Ishiguro's science fiction novel Never Let Me Go as the best novel of 2005 and one of the 100 best English-language novels published between 1923 and 2005. He was nominated for the Academy Award for Best Adapted Screenplay for the 2022 film Living.

Early life
Ishiguro was born in Nagasaki, Japan, on 8 November 1954, the son of Shizuo Ishiguro, a physical oceanographer, and his wife, Shizuko. In 1960, Ishiguro moved with his family to Guildford, Surrey, as his father was invited for research at the National Institute of Oceanography (now the National Oceanography Centre). He did not return to visit Japan until 1989, nearly 30 years later, when he was a participant in the Japan Foundation Short-Term Visitors' Programme.

In an interview with Kenzaburō Ōe, Ishiguro stated that the Japanese settings of his first two novels were imaginary: "I grew up with a very strong image in my head of this other country, a very important other country to which I had a strong emotional tie … In England I was all the time building up this picture in my head, an imaginary Japan."

Ishiguro, who has been described as a British Asian author, explained in a BBC interview how growing up in a Japanese family in the UK was crucial to his writing, enabling him to see things from a different perspective from that of many of his English peers.

He attended Stoughton Primary School and then Woking County Grammar School in Surrey. Ishiguro sang solos as a choirboy with his church and school choirs. He also enjoyed music as a teenager, listening to songs by the likes of Leonard Cohen, Joni Mitchell and, particularly, Bob Dylan. Ishiguro began learning guitar and writing songs, and initially aimed to become a professional songwriter. After finishing school in 1973, he took a gap year and travelled through the United States and Canada, writing a journal and sending demo tapes to record companies. He also worked as a grouse beater, a practice of driven grouse shooting, at Balmoral Castle. Ishiguro later reflected on his ephemeral songwriting career, saying: "I used to see myself as some sort of musician type but there came a point when I thought: actually, this isn't me at all. I'm much less glamorous. I'm one of these people with corduroy jackets with elbow patches. It was a real comedown."

In 1974, he began studies at the University of Kent at Canterbury, graduating in 1978 with a Bachelor of Arts (honours) in English and philosophy. After spending a year writing fiction, he resumed his studies at the University of East Anglia where he studied with Malcolm Bradbury and Angela Carter on the UEA Creative Writing Course, gaining the degree of Master of Arts in 1980. His thesis became his first novel, A Pale View of Hills, published in 1982.

He gained British citizenship in 1983.

Literary career
Ishiguro set his first two novels in Japan; however, in several interviews, he said that he has little familiarity with Japanese writing and that his works bear little resemblance to Japanese fiction. In an interview in 1989, when discussing his Japanese heritage and its influence on his upbringing, he stated, "I'm not entirely like English people because I've been brought up by Japanese parents in a Japanese-speaking home. My parents (...) felt responsible for keeping me in touch with Japanese values. I do have a distinct background. I think differently, my perspectives are slightly different." In a 1990 interview, Ishiguro said, "If I wrote under a pseudonym and got somebody else to pose for my jacket photographs, I'm sure nobody would think of saying, 'This guy reminds me of that Japanese writer.'" Although some Japanese writers have had a distant influence on his writing—Jun'ichirō Tanizaki is the one he most frequently cites—Ishiguro has said that Japanese films, especially those of Yasujirō Ozu and Mikio Naruse, have been a more significant influence.

Some of Ishiguro's novels are set in the past. Never Let Me Go has science fiction qualities and a futuristic tone; however, it is set in the 1980s and 1990s, and takes place in a parallel world very similar to ours. His fourth novel, The Unconsoled, takes place in an unnamed Central European city. The Remains of the Day is set in the large country house of an English lord in the period surrounding World War II.

An Artist of the Floating World is set in an unnamed Japanese city during the Occupation of Japan following the nation's surrender in 1945. The narrator is forced to come to terms with his part in World War II. He finds himself blamed by the new generation who accuse him of being part of Japan's misguided foreign policy, and is forced to confront the ideals of the modern times as represented by his grandson. Ishiguro said of his choice of time period, "I tend to be attracted to pre-war and postwar settings because I'm interested in this business of values and ideals being tested, and people having to face up to the notion that their ideals weren't quite what they thought they were before the test came."

With the exception of The Buried Giant, Ishiguro's novels are written in the first-person narrative style.

Ishiguro counts Dostoyevsky and Proust among his influences. His works have also been compared to Salman Rushdie, Jane Austen, and Henry James, though Ishiguro himself rejects these comparisons.

In 2017, Ishiguro was awarded the Nobel Prize in Literature, with the motivation "in novels of great emotional force, [he] has uncovered the abyss beneath our illusory sense of connection with the world". In response to receiving the award, Ishiguro stated:It's a magnificent honour, mainly because it means that I'm in the footsteps of the greatest authors that have lived, so that's a terrific commendation. The world is in a very uncertain moment and I would hope all the Nobel Prizes would be a force for something positive in the world as it is at the moment. I'll be deeply moved if I could in some way be part of some sort of climate this year in contributing to some sort of positive atmosphere at a very uncertain time.

Ishiguro was appointed Knight Bachelor for services to literature in the 2018 Birthday Honours.

Ishiguro's eighth novel, Klara and the Sun, was published by Faber and Faber on 2 March 2021. Rumaan Alam of The New Republic wrote it is "more simple than it seems, less novel than parable." It was longlisted for the 2021 Booker Prize. In the novel he discusses subjects such as the dangers of technological advancement, the future of our world, and the meaning of being human that he also broached in his earlier books.

Ishiguro adapted the screenplay for the 2022 British film Living, directed by Oliver Hermanus and starring Bill Nighy, from the 1952 Japanese film Ikiru directed by Akira Kurosawa. In 2023, Living was nominated for an Oscar Award in the Best Adapted Screenplay category.

Musical work
Ishiguro has co-written several songs for the jazz singer Stacey Kent with saxophonist Jim Tomlinson, Kent's husband. Ishiguro contributed lyrics to Kent's 2007 Grammy-nominated album Breakfast on the Morning Tram, including its title track, her 2011 album, Dreamer in Concert, her 2013 album The Changing Lights, and her 2017 album, I Know I Dream. Ishiguro also wrote the liner notes to Kent's 2002 album In Love Again. Ishiguro first met Kent after he chose her recording of "They Can't Take That Away from Me" as one of his Desert Island Discs in 2002 and Kent subsequently asked him to write for her.

Ishiguro has said of his lyric writing that "with an intimate, confiding, first-person song, the meaning must not be self-sufficient on the page. It has to be oblique, sometimes you have to read between the lines" and that this realisation has had an "enormous influence" on his fiction writing.

Personal life
Ishiguro has been married to Lorna MacDougall, a social worker, since 1986. They met at the West London Cyrenians homelessness charity in Notting Hill, where Ishiguro was working as a residential resettlement worker. The couple live in London. Their daughter, Naomi Ishiguro, is also an author, and published the book Escape Routes.

He describes himself as a "serious cinephile" and "great admirer of Bob Dylan".

Honours and awards

National or state honours
 1995:  Appointed Officer of the Order of the British Empire for services to literature
 1998:  Chevalier de l'Ordre des Arts et des Lettres by the French government
 2018:  Order of the Rising Sun, 2nd Class, Gold and Silver Star by the Japanese government
 2018:  Appointed Knight Bachelor for services to literature

Literary awards
 1982: Winifred Holtby Memorial Prize for A Pale View of Hills
 1986: Whitbread Prize for An Artist of the Floating World
 1989: Booker Prize for The Remains of the Day
 2017: Nobel Prize in Literature
 2017: American Academy of Achievement's Golden Plate Award

Except for A Pale View of Hills and The Buried Giant, all of Ishiguro's novels and his short story collection have been shortlisted for major awards. Most significantly, An Artist of the Floating World, When We Were Orphans, and Never Let Me Go were all short-listed for the Booker Prize (as was The Remains of the Day, which won it). A leaked account of a judging committee's meeting revealed that the committee found itself deciding between Never Let Me Go and John Banville's The Sea before awarding the prize to the latter.

Other distinctions
 1983: Published in the Granta Best Young British Novelists issue
 1993: Published in the Granta Best Young British Novelists issue
 2005: Never Let Me Go named on Time magazine's list of the 100 greatest English language novels since the magazine's formation in 1923.
 2008: The Times ranked Ishiguro 32nd on their list of "The 50 Greatest British Writers Since 1945".
 2023: Living was nominated for the 2023 Academy Award for Best Adapted Screenplay. With the nomination, Ishiguro became the 6th Nobel Prize recipient to earn an Academy Award nomination. Only 2 individuals, George Bernard Shaw and Bob Dylan have won both. It was also nominated for the 2022 BAFTA Award for Best Adapted Screenplay

Works

Novels
 A Pale View of Hills (1982)
 An Artist of the Floating World (1986)
 The Remains of the Day (1989)
 The Unconsoled (1995)
 When We Were Orphans (2000)
 Never Let Me Go (2005)
 The Buried Giant (2015)
 Klara and the Sun (2021)

Short-story collections 

 Nocturnes: Five Stories of Music and Nightfall (2009)

Screenplays
 A Profile of Arthur J. Mason (television film for Channel 4) (1984)
 The Gourmet (television film for Channel 4) (1987)
 The Saddest Music in the World (2003)
 The White Countess (2005)
 Living (2022)

Short fiction
 "A Strange and Sometimes Sadness", "Waiting for J" and "Getting Poisoned" (in Introduction 7: Stories by New Writers, 1981)
 "A Family Supper" (in Firebird 2: Writing Today, 1983)
 "Summer After the War" (in Granta 7, 1983)
 "October 1948" (in Granta 17, 1985)
 "A Village After Dark" (in The New Yorker, May 21, 2001)

Lyrics
 "The Ice Hotel"; "I Wish I Could Go Travelling Again"; "Breakfast on the Morning Tram", and "So Romantic"; Jim Tomlinson / Kazuo Ishiguro, on Stacey Kent's 2007 Grammy-nominated album, Breakfast on the Morning Tram.
"Postcard Lovers"; Tomlinson / Ishiguro, on Kent's album Dreamer in Concert (2011).
 "The Summer We Crossed Europe in the Rain"; "Waiter, Oh Waiter", and "The Changing Lights"; Tomlinson / Ishiguro, on Kent's album The Changing Lights (2013).
 "Bullet Train"; "The Changing Lights", and "The Ice Hotel"; Tomlinson / Ishiguro, on Kent's album I Know I Dream: The Orchestral Sessions (2017).
 "The Ice Hotel"; Tomlinson / Ishiguro – Quatuor Ébène, featuring Stacey Kent, on the album Brazil (2013).

Adaptations
 The Remains of the Day (1993 film)
 The Remains of the Day (2010 musical), Union Theatre, London
 Never Let Me Go (2010 film)
 Never Let Me Go (2016 TV miniseries)
 An Artist of the Floating World (2019 TV movie)

References

External links

 Kazuo Ishiguro's archive resides at the Harry Ransom Center at The University of Texas at Austin 
 
 Faber and Faber page on Ishiguro
 Dialogue between Kazuo Ishiguro and Kenzaburo Oe
List of works
 
 
 2005 interview with Ishiguro in Sigla Magazine
 2006 Guardian Book Club podcast with Ishiguro by John Mullan
 1989 "A Case of Cultural Misperception," a profile at the New York Times by Susan Chira
 2005 "Living Memories," a profile at The Guardian by Nicholas Wroe
  NHK WORLD (December 2017). Exclusive Interview with Kazuo Ishiguro
  including the Nobel Lecture 7 December 2017 My Twentieth Century Evening – and Other Small Breakthroughs

1954 births
20th-century British male writers
20th-century British novelists
21st-century British male writers
21st-century British novelists
Alumni of the University of East Anglia
Alumni of the University of Kent
Booker Prize winners
British lyricists
British male novelists
British Nobel laureates
Chevaliers of the Ordre des Arts et des Lettres
Costa Book Award winners
English-language writers from Japan
Exophonic writers
Fellows of the Royal Society of Literature
Japanese emigrants to the United Kingdom
Knights Bachelor
Living people
Naturalised citizens of the United Kingdom
Nobel laureates in Literature
Officers of the Order of the British Empire
People from Nagasaki
Postmodern writers
Recipients of the Order of the Rising Sun, 2nd class
Writers of modern Arthurian fiction